For Latin music from a year between 1986 to 1989, go to 86 | 87 | 88 | 89

This article includes an overview of the major events and trends in Latin music in the 1980s, namely in Ibero-America (including Spain and Portugal). This includes recordings, festivals, award ceremonies, births and deaths of Latin music artists, and the advancement and adjournment of the genre from 1980 to 1989.

Charts
List of number-one Billboard Top Latin Songs from the 1980s
List of number-one Billboard Latin Pop Albums from the 1980s
List of number-one Billboard Regional Mexican Albums from the 1980s
List of number-one Billboard Tropical Albums from the 1980s

Overview
The 1980s saw the major record labels such as RCA/Ariola, CBS, and EMI form their own Latin music divisions. By 1985, Billboard noted that the Latin music industry saw increase in awareness from major corporations such as Coca-Cola promoting Julio Iglesias and Pepsi advertising Menudo.

Latin pop

The romantic balada, which gained popularity in the 1970s, continued to dominate the Latin music charts in the 1980s. Veteran balladeers who continued to be popular in this decade include Julio Iglesias, José José, Roberto Carlos, and Juan Gabriel.  The Latin balada is characterized by its bolero origin by fusing music from the United States with pop, R&B, and rock. The 1980s was a golden era for the Venezuelan entertainment industry as popular telenovelas from the country also led to several actors to become successful singers such as Carlos Mata and Guillermo Dávila. Theme songs from telenovelas also became popular on radio airwaves in Venezuela. Female balada singers that became topped the Latin music charts includes Ana Gabriel, Daniela Romo, Rocío Dúrcal, Gloria Estefan, and Marisela. Notably, several baladas were Spanish-language covers of songs originally performed in Italian. Notable Spanish-language covers of Italian songs include "Maldita Primavera" by Yuri, "Toda la Vida" by Emmanuel and Franco, "Yo No Te Pido la Luna" by Daniela Romo, and "Tan Enamorados" by Ricardo Montaner.

Aside from the baladas, several Latin pop artists and bands performed variety of Spanish-language pop and dance music targeted to the younger audience. These include Yuri, Marisela, Mecano, Miguel Bosé, Timbiriche, Menudo, and Flans. "Que Te Pasa" became the longest-running chart of the 1980s, spending 16 weeks on top of the Billboard Hot Latin Tracks chart. Juan Gabriel and Rocío Dúrcal collaborated with Chuck Anderson to incorporate mariachi arrangements on their ballads. Child pop singers such as Pablito Ruiz, Luis Miguel, Pedrito Fernández, and Lucerito had a prepubescent following. The Miami Sound Machine, whose vocals were led by Gloria Estefan, gained international fame in 1985 with their crossover hit song "Conga". The song blends both pop music and Latin music from the Caribbean.

Regional Mexican

In the 1980s, the regional music scene in both Mexico and the Mexican American community in the United States was dominated by grupera. This style of Mexican music combines cumbia, norteño, and rock music. The lyrics are rooted with romantic themes including heartbroken songs. Several notable grupera ensembles include Los Caminantes, Los Yonic's, Los Bukis, and Los Temerarios. Norteño band Los Tigres del Norte continued their success from the 1970s with their corridos involving social commentary such as "Jaula de oro" ("The Golden Cage") which tells of a Mexican man who crosses the Mexico-United States border illegally and raises a family in the United States who denies their Mexican heritage while the man longs to return to his country. Its parent album reached number one on the Regional Mexican charts in the United States. Similarly, Mexican singer-songwriter Joan Sebastian incorporated sounds of rancheras and ballads on his songs and was dubbed "El Rey del Jaripeo" ("The King of Mexican Rodeo").

Tejano music was also popular to the Mexican Americans living in the United States mainly in Texas. Its style is characterized by its influences from polka, cumbia, bolero, and ranchera as well as pop, rap, country music and reggae.  Tejano bands such as Mazz, La Mafia, and Little Joe and La Familia pushed Tejano's popularity beyond the United States. Ranchera Vicente Fernández still remain relevant in the 1980s. His album, Por Tu Maldito Amor (1989), became the longest running number one Regional Mexican album of the decade in the United States with 21 weeks consecutive weeks at this position. American singer Linda Ronstadt, who is of Mexican descent, released Canciones de Mi Padre, a collection of songs that her father would sing. The album was certified double platinum by the RIAA for shipping over two million copies in the United States.

Tropical/salsa

The New York salsa, which was popularized Fania Records in the 1970s, saw a major decline in the scene. Merengue music from the Dominican Republic became favored by Latinos living in New York City. Wilfrido Vargas was credited for bringing merengue attention to the younger audience. Merengue music also became popular even in Puerto Rico.  Another factor to merengue's popularity in the dance clubs was that it was easier to dance to compared to salsa. Milly Quezada, lead vocals of the group Milly y los Vecinos, became the first notable female merengue singer. The group was formed by her husband Rafael Vasquez, who was also her manager. Other notable merengue acts in the 1980s include Bonny Cepeda, Fernando Villalona, Juan Luis Guerra & 4.40 and Los Hijos del Rey. Vargas also formed the first all-female band Las Chicas del Can. Juan Luis Guerra performed not only love songs, but also social commentary about the poverty in the Dominican Republic and those living abroad such as "Visa Para un Sueño" ("Visa For a Dream") and "Ojala Que Llueva Café" ("I Hope It Rains Coffee").

Although New York salsa faded in popularity, another form of salsa music gained attention in its place. This form of salsa, which was slower-placed and more focused on its romantic lyrics, was known as salsa romántica. The salsa romántica movement helped salsa continued to be relevant in spite of the rise of merengue music as well as moving away from lyrics dealing with social class. Salsa romántica was characterized by its influence by the aforementioned romantic ballads and more pop-leaning sounds. In fact, several famous songs done by salsa romántica singers were covers of songs originally sung by balada musicians. "Lluvia", a song first composed by Luis Ángel, was covered by Eddie Santiago and became on the highest-peaking salsa romántica on the Hot Latin Tracks at number four. A sub-style of salsa romántica also included erotic lyrics and became known as salsa erotica. "Ven Devórame Otra Vez" by Lalo Rodríguez, a notable salsa erotica song, became a top ten hit on the Hot Latin Tracks chart. Other famous salsa romantica singers include Frankie Ruiz, Luis Enrique, Willie Gonzalez, David Pabón, and José Alberto "El Canario". In the early 1980s, Cuban musician and bandleader Roberto Torres had a major hit with his cover version of "Caballo Viejo". The song was performed as a charanga vallenata style, a combination of the Cuban charanga and the Colombian vallenato music. It was later inducted into the Latin Grammy Hall of Fame in 2007.

Rock en español
Soda Stereo released Signos in 1986 which helped pop rock en español music reach to an audience beyond Argentina.

Brazilian/Portuguese

1980

Events
February 27: Irakere wins the Grammy Award for Best Latin Recording at the 22nd Annual Grammy Awards for their self-titled album.
November 15Rafael José, representing Puerto Rico, wins the 9th Annual Festival with his song "Contigo Mujer".

Notable singles

Iván: "Sin Amor" (#1 in Spain)
Pecos: "Háblame de Tí" (#1 in Spain)
Francis Cabrel: "La quiero a morir" (#1 in Spain)
Julio Iglesias: "Hey!" (#1 in Argentina, #1 in Spain)
Miguel Bosé: "Morir de amor" (#1 in Spain)
Miguel Bosé: "Don Diablo" (#1 in Spain)
Mario Milito: "Este es Mi Regalo" (#1 in Argentina)
Toto Cutugno: "Sólo tú, sólo yo"
Ángela Carrasco: "Quiereme" (#1 in Argentina)

Album releases

Cal Tjader: Gozame! Pero Ya...
Cal Tjader Sextet: La Onda Va Bien
Irakere: Irakere 2
Julio Iglesias: Hey!
Tito Puente: Dancemania 80's
Roberto Torres y su Charanga Vallenata: Vol. II
Peret: El Jilguero
Miguel Ríos: 
Parchís: Villancicos
Rodolfo Aicardi:  El De Siempre
Roberto Carlos: 
Los Yonic's: En Su Punto
María Martha Serra Lima: Entre Nosotros
Lalo Rodríguez: Simplemente... Lalo
Cheo Feliciano: Sentimiento, Tú
Héctor Lavoe: El Sabio
Ray Barretto: Giant Force
Angélica María: Y el Sentir de Juan Gabriel
Emmanuel: 
Miguel Bosé: Miguel
José Luis Rodríguez: 
Dyango: La Radio
José José: Amor Amor
José José: Romántico
José Luis Rodríguez: Atrevete
Lupita D'Alessio: Lupita D'Alessio (1980)
José María Napoleón: Celos
Andy Montañez: Salsa Con Cache
El Gran Combo de Puerto Rico: Unity
 Casanova
Camilo Sesto: Amaneciendo
Lissette: Lissette
Alberto Cortez: Castillos en el Aire
Vikki Carr: Y El Amor: Canta en Español
Yuri: Esperanzas
Hernaldo Zúñiga: Hernaldo
Los Bravos del Norte de Ramón Ayala: Cuando Mas Necesite de Tu Cariño
La India de Oriente: La India de Oriente
Oscar D'León: Al Frente de Todos
Fania All Stars: California Jam
Ray Conniff: Exclusivamente Latino
Juan Gabriel: Recuerdos
Juan Gabriel: Juan Gabriel con Mariachi
Manoella Torres: Ahora No
Tania: Indiscutible
Miguel Gallardo: 
: Demasiado Amor — Canta a Juan Gabriel
Los Humildes: Mas de Lo Que Merecias
Los Cadetes de Linares: El Chubasco
Lorenzo De Monteclaro: Abrazado de un Poste
Beatriz Adriana: México y Su Música
Celia Cruz, Johnny Pacheco and Pete "El Conde" Rodríguez: Celia, Johnny, Pete
Willie Rosario: El De a 20 de Willie
Wilfrido Vargas: El Jeque
Johanna Rosaly: Sencillamente
Roberto Roena: Looking Out For Numero Uno
Roberto Roena: Que Suerte He Tenido de Nacer
: Dedicado a...Esa Mujer
Johnny Pacheco, José Fajardo, Pupi Legarreta, and Javier Vazquez: Las Tres Flautas
Adalberto Santiago: Feliz Me Siento
Mazz: Class
Rocío Dúrcal: 
Milly y Los Vecinos: En Su Momento
Johnny Ventura: Yo Soy el Merengue
: Tumbando Puertas
Tito Rojas: Tito Rojas & El Conjunto Borincano
Betty Missiego: Mi Tierra
Rubén Blades: 
Rigo Tovar & su Costa Azul: Rigo Tovar En Vivo
Basilio: Basilio (1980)
Rafael José: Contigo Mujer
Yolandita Monge: Fantasía
: Los Muecas
Lupita D'Alessio: En Concierto
Little Joe: King Of The Brown Sound
Gualberto Castro: Que Mal Amada Estas
Aniceto Molina: Cabaretera
ABBA: Gracias Por La Música
Louie Ramirez: Salsero
Raphael: Y... Sigo Mi Camino
Los Bravos del Norte de Ramón Ayala: Pistoleros Famosos
Los Bravos del Norte de Ramón Ayala: Más Música Brava
: Mi Amor
Henry Fiol: Fe, Esperanza y Caridad
Raffaella Carrà: Latino
Bonny Cepeda: El Maestro
Joan Sebastian: Joan Sebastian (1980)
Tony Croatto: Tradición
Los Tigres Del Norte: En La Plaza Garibaldi
Willie Colón and Ismael Miranda: Doble Energía
Oscar D'León: Presenta La Critica Con Wladimir Y Teo
Fania All Stars: Commitment
Agustín Ramírez: Necesito Tu Amor
Pedrito Fernández: La Mugrosita
Beatriz Adriana: Adios y Bienvenida
La India de Oriente: ¡Desde El Cobre Con Amor!
Johnny Pacheco: Champ
Verónica Castro: Norteño
Los Cadetes de Linares: Pelicula Pistoleros 
Los Pasteles Verdes: Solitario
Marvin Santiago: Caliente y Explosivo!
Orchestra Harlow: El Dulce Aroma del Exito
Rafael Cortijo: El Sueño del Maestro
Daniel Santos: 50
Vicente Fernández: El Tapatio
Los Huracanes del Norte: El Hijo de la Musiquera
Ismael Rivera: Maelo
Alfredo "Chocolate" Armenteros: Monsieur Chocolate Prefiero El Son
Willy Chirino: Diferente
: Boleros y Cha Cha Chas
Roberto Pulido & Los Clasicos: Mi Pequeñito
Rigo Tovar: Y Su Costa Azul
La Sonora Ponceña: New Heights
La Lupe: En Algo Nuevo
:  Yo creo en ti
Arrigo Barnabé: Clara Crocodilo
Itamar Assumpção and Banda Isca de Polícia: Beleléu, Leléu, Eu
Egberto Gismonti: Circense

Deaths

Births
May 12Silvestre Dangond, Colombian vallenato singer
August 29Flex, Panamanian reggaeton singer
November 14Pedro Capó, Puerto Rican pop singer

1981

Events
February 25: Cal Tjader wins the Grammy Award for Best Latin Recording at the 23rd Annual Grammy Awards for La Onda Va Bien.

Notable singles

Camilo Sesto: "Perdóname" (#1 in Spain)
Ana Belén: "Que será" (#1 in Spain)
Iván: "Te Quiero Tanto" (#1 in Spain)
José Luis Perales: "Te Quiero" (#1 in Spain)
Víctor Manuel: "Ay Amor" (#1 in Spain)
Julio Iglesias: "De niña a mujer" (#1 in Spain)
Lucrecia: "Papucho Mío" (#1 in Argentina)
Franco Simone: "Tu Para Mi" (#1 in Argentina)
Pimpinela: "Tú Me Promiste Volver"
Jeanette: "Frente a Frente" (#1 in Argentina)
Menudo: "Súbete a mi Moto"

Album releases

Willie Colón and Rubén Blades: Canciones Del Solar De Los Aburridos
Clare Fischer and Salsa Picante: 2+2
Dizzy Gillespie with Mongo Santamaría and Toots Thielemans: Summertime Digital at Montreaux, 1980
Eddie Palmieri: Eddie Palmieri
Laurindo Almeida and Charlie Byrd: Brazilian Soul
Raphael: En Carne Viva
Miami Sound Machine: Otra Vez
Little Joe: Mano a Mano
: Sabú
Los Bukis: Presiento Que Voy a Llorar
José José: Gracias
Yuri: Llena de dulzura
Rocío Jurado: 
Rocío Jurado: Canciones de España
Camilo Sesto: 
Beatriz Adriana: La Reina es el Rey
Roberto Carlos: 
Menudo: Fuego
Menudo: Quiero Ser
Andy Montañez: Trovador del Amor
Andy Montañez: Para Ustedes...Con Sabor!
Bacchelli Prohibido
: Yo Mismo
Vicente Fernández: El Número Uno
Vicente Fernández: Valses del Recuerdo
Johnny Ventura: Lo Que Te Gusta
: Bueno de Vicio
Danny Rivera: Gitano
Vikki Carr: El Retrato de Amor
Lisandro Meza: Canción para una Muerte Anunciada
Raphy Leavitt: 10 Aňos Sembrando Semillas en el Alma del Pueblo
Julio Iglesias: De niña a mujer
Glenn Monroig: En Concierto
: Joseito Mateo y Su Pericombo
Los Bravos del Norte de Ramón Ayala: Amor Vaquero
Los Bravos del Norte de Ramón Ayala: Dos Monedas
Manolo Muñoz: Ando Que Me Lleva
Los Panchos María Martha Serra Lima: Esencia Romantica
Henry Fiol: El Secreto
Rocío Dúrcal: Confidencias
Rocío Dúrcal: 
Milly y los Vecinos: Fiesta Con Los Vecinos
Los Freddy's: El Primer Tonto
Plácido Domingo: Plácido Domingo Sings Tangos
Manolo Galván: Me Llaman el Calavera
José Mangual Jr: Que lo Diga el Tiempo
Roberto Angleró: La Trulla Moderna
Dyango: Entre una espada y la pared 
: Amar Es
Iva Zanicchi: Nostalgias
Paloma San Basilio: Ahora
Amanda Miguel: El Sonido Vol. 1
: Tan Adentro de Mi Alma
Verónica Castro: Cosas de Amigos
Tito Puente: Ce' Magnifique
Néstor Torres: No Me Provoques
Wilfrido Vargas: Cosas de Mi Amigo Miguelito
Lupita D'Alessio: Lupita D'Alessio (1981)
Lupita D'Alessio: Sentimiento Ranchero
Juan Gabriel: Con Tu Amor
El Gran Combo de Puerto Rico: Happy Days
Oscar D'León: A Mi Si Me Gusta Asi!
Bobby Valentin: Siempre En Forma
La Sonora Ponceña: Night Rider
La Sonora Ponceña: Unchained Force
Rubén Blades and Willie Colón: Canciones Del Solar De Los Aburridos
Grupo Pegasso: Vol. 2
Roberto Pulido y Los Clasicos: Aquí
Héctor Lavoe: Que Sentimiento!
Celia Cruz and Willie Colón:– Celia y Willie
La Sonora Matancera and Justo Betancourt: La Sonora Matancera con Justo Betancourt
Wilfrido Vargas and Sandy Reyes: Abusadora
Johnny Pacheco and Celio González: El Zorro De Plata Presenta Al Flaco De Oro
Fania All-Stars: Latin Connection
Galy Galiano: Frío de Ausencia
Ismael Miranda: La Clave del Sabor
Luis "Perico" Ortiz: El Astro
Típica 73: Into The 80's
: Latino
Miguel Bosé: Más Alla
Orlando Contreras and Daniel Santos: Los Jefes
Felipe Rodríguez: La Voz
Willie Rosario: The Portrait of a Salsa Man
Beatriz Adriana: El Cofrecito
Ángela Carrasco: Con Amor
: Tangos a media luz
Fania All Stars: The Perfect Blend
Tony Croatto: Arrímese Mi Compáy
Los Bravos del Norte de Ramón Ayala: Con Las Puertas en la Cara
La Mafia: Only in Texas
Los Tigres Del Norte: Un Día a la Vez
Lorenzo De Monteclaro: Ese Señor de las Canas
Pellín Rodríguez: Reflexiones Pasadas
: Juan Mucho Más
Karina: Ahora que estuviste lejos
Los Humildes: A Mis Amigos del Norte
Joan Sebastian: Joan Sebastian (1981)
Rigo Tovar: Rigo 81
Las Jilguerillas: El Bracero Fracasado
: Canta Si Va' Cantar
Andy Montañez: La Última Copa
Willie Colón: Fantasmas
Marvin Santiago: Adentro
Johnny Ventura: Johnny Mucho... Mucho Johnny!
Los Cadetes de Linares: Cazador de Asesinos
Mocedades: 
Nelson Ned: Perdidamente Enamorado/Perdidamente Apaixonado
Bacchelli: Y sólo tú
Richard Clayderman: Balada para Adelina
Milly Quezada: No Te Puedo Tener
Diego Verdaguer: Estoy Vivo
José María Napoleón: Tú y nadie más
Cuco Valoy & Los Virtuosos: Sin Comentarios
Lolita Flores: Seguir Soñando
Gilberto Monroig: Mi Jaragual
Roberto Torres: Recuerda al Trio Matamoros
Yolanda del Río: Yolanda del Río
Sunny & The Sunliners: El Amante
Chucho Avellanet: 20 Años en la Canción
Anthony Ríos: Estás Dónde No Estás
Little Joe & La Familia: Prieta Linda
Chico Alvarez: Montuneando
Leonardo Paniagua: Con Mariachi
Tony Croatto: Creo en Dios
Roberto Pulido: Llorando en Mi Tumba

Deaths

Births
January 15Pitbull American rapper
January 21Michel Teló, Brazilian sertanejo singer
January 29Álex Ubago, Spanish pop singer
March 17Nicky Jam, Puerto Rican reggaeton singer
July 21Romeo Santos, American bachata singer-songwriter, member of Aventura
October 5Tito El Bambino, Puerto Rican reggaeton singer
December 16Gaby Moreno, Guatemalan pop singer
December 29Natalia Jiménez, Spanish pop singer

1982

Events
The first edition of the Juguemos a Cantar festival is launched in Mexico. It consisted of a competition between young singers below the age of 13, with the intent to seek out young talent; indeed, many of the children that performed on the three editions of the festival would go on to have successful music careers as adults.
February 25: Claire Fischer wins the Grammy Award for Best Latin Recording at the 24th Annual Grammy Awards for "Guajira Pa' Me Jeva".

Notable singles

 Sandra Mihanovich: "Puerto Pollensa" (#1 in Argentina)
Camilo Sesto": "Amor, no me ignores" (#1 in Mexico)
Amanda Miguel: "Él me mintió" (#1 in Mexico)
Amanda Miguel: "Mi buen corazón" (#1 in Mexico)
Luis Miguel: "1+1=2 enamorados" (#1 in Mexico)
Yuri: "Maldita Primavera" (#1 in Mexico)
Menudo: "Fuego" (#1 in Mexico)
Ricchi e Poveri: "Será porque te amo" (#1 in Spain)
Paloma San Basilio: "Juntos" (#1 in Spain)
Mecano: ""Me Colé en una Fiesta" (#1 in Spain)
Alaska y Los Pegamoides: "Bailando" (#1 in Spain)
Claudia Mori: "No Sucederá Más" (#1 in Spain)
Julio Iglesias: "No Me Vuelvo a Enamorar" (#1 in Spain)
Mocedades: "Amor de Hombre" (#1 in Spain)
Silvestre: "Ana, No Te Enamores de Mi" (#1 in Argentina)

Album releases

Vicente Fernández: ...
Menudo: Una Aventura Llamada Menudo
Menudo: Por Amor
Los Bukis: Yo Te Necesito
Machito: Machito and His Salsa Big Band '82
Ray Baretto: Rhythm of Life
José Feliciano: Escenas de Amor
Julio Iglesias: Momentos
Silvio Rodríguez: Unicornio
José Luis Perales: 
Perla: Confidencias
Pimpinela: Pimpinela
Wilkins: Aventura
Ednita Nazario: Ednita
Guillermo Dávila: Guillermo Dávila
Rocío Dúrcal: 
José José: Mi Vida
Ramón Ayala y Los Bravos del Norte:Mi Golondrina una Botella
Ramón Ayala y Los Bravos del Norte:Una Carta
Aida Cuevas: Canta Lo Nuevo de Juan Gabriel
Willie Colón: Corazón Guerrero
Camilo Sesto: Con Ganas
Fernando Villalona: El Mayimbe
Dulce: 
Lorenzo Antonio: Lorenzo Antonio
Milly y los Vecinos: ¡Acabando!
Lupita D'Alessio: Vieras Cuantas Ganas Tengo
Lupita D'Alessio: Borraré Tu Nombre
Bonny Cepeda: Arrasando Con Todo
: Fiel
Juan Gabriel: Cosas de Enamorados
Wilfrido Vargas and Sandy Reyes: Wilfrido Vargas and Sandy Reyes
Bobby Valentín: Presenta A Él — Cano Estremera
Johnny Ventura: El Sueño
Nano Cabrera: Este Pueblo Tiene Sabor
El Gran Combo de Puerto Rico: Nuestro Aniversario
Los Invasores de Nuevo León: Aguanta Corazón
Los Invasores de Nuevo León: Ni Dada La Quiero
Roberto Torres y su Charanga Vallenata: Vol. III
Miami Sound Machine: Río
Elio Roca: Sólo Tu Amor Me Hace Feliz
Fernando Sallaberry: Menudo Presenta A Fernando
María Martha Serra Lima: Estilo
La Mafia: The Magnificent 7
La Mafia: Honey (Cariño)
Sandro de América: Fue Sin Querer
Lucía Méndez: Cerca de ti
Bacchelli: Culpable 
José Luis Rodríguez: 
Celia Cruz and La Sonora Matancera: Feliz Encuentro
La Sonora Ponceña: Determination
Willy Chirino: Chirinisimo
Ray Conniff: Amor Amor
Joan Sebastian: Así de Loco
Rolando Laserie and Johnny Pacheco: De Película
Los Tigres del Norte: Carrera Contra La Muerte
Tony Croatto: Jibaro
Oscar D'León & Su Orquesta: El Discóbolo
: 
Los Chamos: Siempre Te Amaré
Los Freddy's: El Tren
Rodolfo Aicardi:  Que Chevere, Vol. 3
Los Cadetes de Linares: Me Voy Amor
Los Cadetes De Linares: Un Viejo Amor
Los Barón de Apodaca: A Cada Rato
Rubén Blades and Willie Colón: The Last Fight
Mazz: Pesado
Antonio Cabán Vale: Cantos de Altura
Marvin Santiago: El Hijo del Pueblo
Willie Rosario: Atizame el Fogón
Lourdes & Carlos: Lourdes y Carlos
Daniel Santos: Introducción y El Borracho No Vale
Rafael Solano: Los Galleros
Los Tigres Del Norte: Carrera Contra la Muerte
Los Humildes: X Aniversario
Lucha Villa: De Parte de Quien
Soledad Bravo: Caribe
Chucho Avellanet: Yo Siento... Yo Canto
Diego Verdaguer: Coco Loco
Ricchi e Poveri: 
Roberto Carlos: 
Jeanette: Corazón de poeta
Emmanuel: 
Estela Raval: Tributo a Mis Amigos
Mazz: Command Performance
Roberto Pulido: Envidias
Flaco Jiménez: El Gran
Rigo Tovar: Rigo En Serenata
Rigo Tovar: 10 Años Tropicalisimo
Luis Miguel: Un sol
Luis Miguel: Directo al corazón
Luis "Perico" Ortiz: Sabroso
Miguel Poventud: Eres Todo En Mi
Jossie Esteban y la Patrulla 15: Jossie Esteban y la Patrulla 15
Plácido Domingo: Adoro
Andy Montañez: Solo Boleros
Leo Dan: Tengan Cuidado
 Empate De Amor
Roberto Roena: Super Apollo 47:50
La India de Oriente" Buenos Dias Africa
: El amor, amor
Tommy Olivencia & Su Orquesta: Un Triángulo De Triunfo!
Johnny Pacheco and José Fajardo: Pacheco y Fajardo
Alfredo "Chocolate" Armenteros: Dice
Ismael Miranda: Exitos de los 50
 and la Orquesta Bobby Valentin: Vicentico Valdés y la Orquesta Bobby Valentin
Iva Zanicchi: Yo, por amarte
Manolo Otero: Cantando
Raquel Olmedo: La Fuerza De Una Voz Que Impone el Cambio
Víctor Yturbe: El Siempre Romántico
Fernando Villalona¡Feliz Cumbe!
Cuco Valoy & Los Virtuosos: Chevere
: Paraíso
Mecano: Mecano
Blitz: As Aventuras da Blitz

Deaths

Births

1983

Events
February 23: Machito wins the Grammy Award for Best Latin Recording at the 25th Annual Grammy Awards for Machito and His Salsa Big Band '82.
June 18The National Academy of Recording Arts and Sciences announces that the Grammy Award for Latin music would be split into three separate categories: Best Latin Pop Performance, Best Mexican/Mexican-American Performance, and Best Tropical Latin Performance.

Notable singles

Luis Miguel: "Directo al corazón" (#1 in Mexico, #1 in Argentina)
Menudo: "Claridad" (#1 in Mexico)
Amanda Miguel: "Castillos" (#1 in Mexico)
Rocío Dúrcal: "Tienes que ser cruel" (#1 in Mexico)
Yuri: "Yo te amo, te amo" (#1 in Mexico)
Daniela Romo: "Mentiras" (#1 in Mexico)
Daniela Romo: "Celos" (#1 in Mexico)
Juan Gabriel: "Caray" (#1 in Mexico)
Tino Casal: "Embrujada" (#1 in Spain)
Azul y Negro: "No Tengo Tiempo (Con los Dedos de una Mano)"
Pimpinela: "Olvídame y Pega la Vuelta" (#1 in Argentina, #1 in Spain)

Album releases

Los Huracanes del Norte: Las Paredes de Mi Casa
Plácido Domingo: Siempre en Mi Corazón — Always in My Heart
José José: Secretos
Roberto Carlos: 
José Feliciano: Me Enamoré
Lani Hall: Lani
José Luis Rodríguez: Ven
Juan Gabriel: Todo
Tito Puente and His Latin Ensemble: On Broadway
Willie Colón: Corazón Guerrero
Rubén Blades: El Que la Hace la Paga
Mongo Santamaría: Mongo Magic
Ray Barretto, Celia Cruz, and Adalberto Santiago: Tremendo Trío
Charly García: Clics modernos
Wilfrido Vargas: El Funcionario
Miami Sound Machine: A Toda Maquina
Yolandita Monge: Sueños
Lucía Méndez: Enamorada
Los Caminantes: Número Tres
Rocío Jurado: Desde Dentro
Pimpinela: Hermanos
Guillermo Dávila: 
Daniela Romo: Daniela Romo
Camilo Sesto: 
Julio Iglesias: En concierto
La Sonora Ponceña: Future
Menudo: A Todo Rock
Menudo: Reaching Out
Menudo: Feliz Navidad
Massiel: Corazón de Hierro
Ángela Carrasco: Unidos
Rocío Dúrcal: 
Willie Chirino: Subiendo
La Mafia: Mafia Mania
Alberto Cortez: Gardel...Como Yo Te Siento
Los Yonic's: Con Amor
Mocedades: 
Los Caminantes: Supe Perder
Los Caminantes: Especialmente Para Usted
El Gran Combo de Puerto Rico: Universidad de la Salsa
Milly y los Vecinos: Nostalgia
Milly y los Vecinos: Avant Garde
Conjunto Libre: Ritmo Sonido y Estilo
Anthony Ríos: Anthony Ríos
Wilkins: Completamente Vivo
Raphy Leavitt & su Orquesta La Selecta: Siempre Alegre
La Revolución de Emiliano Zapata: La Fuerza de Tu Amor
Johnny Pacheco and Pete "El Conde" Rodríguez: De Nuevo Los Compadres
Oscar D'León: El Sabor de Oscar
Oscar D'León: Con Dulzura
Lorenzo Antonio: Busco un Amor
Lucecita Benítez: Criollo Folklore
Hugo Blanco: De Fiesta
Ricchi e Poveri: 
Andy Montañez: Hoy... y Ayer
Andy Montañez: Tania y Andy
Sergio y Estíbaliz: Agua
Raphael: Enamorado de la Vida
Bonny Cepeda: El Mandamás
: Cariño mío
Crystal: Suavemente
Luis "Perico" Ortiz: Entre Amigos
Los Ángeles Negroes: Locamente Mía
Alfredo "Chocolate" Armenteros: Chocolate En Sexteto
El Combo de Ayer: Aquel Gran Encuentro
Jossie Esteban y la Patrulla 15: Deja ese Diablo
Isabel Pantoja: Cambiar por ti
Jeanette: 
 and Rocío Jurado: Caballo de Batalla
Little Joe: Roots
Little Joe: No Quiero Más Amar
Ramón Ayala y Los Bravos del Norte:En Amo de la Musica Norteña
La Mafia: Electrifying
Johnny Ventura: Flying High
Willie Colón and Héctor Lavoe: Vigilante
Ismael Quintana and Papo Lucca: Mucho talento
Herb Alpert: Noche de Amor
Lolita Flores: Águila Real
Alex & Orquesta Liberación: Cómo Quisiera
Tony Croatto: Tony Croatto y Tu Pueblo
Lupita D'Alessio: Sentimiento al Desnudo
Grupo Pegasso: Él No Te Quiere
Nydia Caro: Nydia Caro
Glenn Monroig: Hola
Miguel Bosé: Made in Spain
Aidita Aviles and Felipe Rodríguez: Por Primera Vez
Los Humildes: Chulita
Beatriz Adriana: Con el Canto en las Venas
Dyango: 
Lissette: Lissette
José María Napoleón: Tiempo al Tiempo
Amanda Miguel: El Último Sonido, Vol. II
Los Hermanos Rosario: Los Hermanos Rosario
: Y Quién es Ese Tonto
Emmanuel: 
Cuco Valoy: El Congo de Oro
Los Cadetes de Linares: Monterrey Como Has Crecido
: Basilio (1983)
La Sonora Dinamita: Terremoto Tropical
Sandra Zaiter: De Pie Sigue La Esperanza
Alberto Cortez: Como el Primer Día
Glenn Monroig: A Mi Manera
René Farrait: Mi Música
 and Bobby Valentín: En La Lejania
Laura Canales: Esta Sed Que Tengo
Willie Rosario: The Salsa Machine
Luis Miguel: Decídete
Mecano: ¿Dónde está el país de las hadas?

Deaths

Births
August 22Nacho, Venezuelan reggaeton, member of Chino & Nacho
September 17Jennifer Peña, Mexican pop and norteño singer
December 13J Álvarez, Puerto Rican reggaeton singer

1984

Events
February 28The 26th Annual Grammy Awards are held at The Shrine Auditorium in Los Angeles, California.:
José Feliciano wins the Grammy Award for Best Latin Pop Performance for Me Enamoré.
Los Lobos wins the Grammy Award for Best Mexican/Mexican-American Performance for "Anselma".
Tito Puente wins the Grammy Award for Best Tropical Latin Performance for On Broadway.

Notable singles

José José: "Lo Dudo" (#1 in Mexico)
Lucía Méndez: "Mi amor, amor"
Lani Hall and Camilo Sesto: "Corazón encadenado"
Juan Gabriel: "Querida" (#1 in Mexico)
La Unión: 	"Lobo-Hombre en París" (#1 in Spain)
Tino Casal: "Pánico en El Edén" (#1 in Spain)
José Luis Perales: "Tentación" (#1 in Spain)
Miguel Bosé: "Sevila" (#1 in Spain)
Alaska y Dinarama: "¿Cómo Pudiste Hacerme Esto a Mí?" (#1 in Spain)

Album releases

José Luis Perales: 
José Luis Rodríguez: Voy a Conquistarte
Juan Gabriel: Recuerdos, Vol. II
Marisela: 
Chiquetete: Eres Mía
Lissette: Caricatura
José Feliciano: Cómo Tu Quieres
Nelson Ned: A Mi Nuevo Amor/Ao Meu Novo Amor
Nelson Ned: Más Romántico Que Nunca
Beatriz Adriana: Arrepentida y Sola
Pimpinela: Convidencias
Miguel Gallardo: Tu Amante o Tu Enemigo
Lucía Méndez: Sólo Una Mujer
Rocío Dúrcal: Canta A Juan Gabriel Volumen 6
Emmanuel: 
José José: Reflexiones
Los Freddy's: Y Me Enamoré
Los Invasores de Nuevo León: Cariño
Víctor Yturbe: Homenaje a los Trios
Los Bukis: Mi Fantasia
Joan Sebastian: Rumores
Grupo Yndio: Adios
Los Invasores de Nuevo León: Amor a la Ligera
Los Cadetes de Linares: Despedida Con Mariachi
Vikki Carr: Simplemente Mujer
Los Tigres del Norte: La Jaula de Oro
Milly y los Vecinos: Esta Noche!
Grupo Niche: 
Johnny Ventura: Y Buena Que Esta... Maria
El Gran Combo de Puerto Rico: In Alaska: Breaking the Ice
Rubén Blades: Mucho Mejor
Los Prisioneros: La Voz De Los 80
Belkis Concepción and Las Chicas Del Can: Belkis Concepción & Las Chicas Del Can
Ray Barretto: Todo Se Va Poder
Tommy Olivencia & su Orquesta: Celebrando Otro Aniversario
Roberto Torres: Corazón de Pueblo
Luis "Perico" Ortiz: La Vida en Broma
Wilfrido Vargas: El Jardinero
María de Lourdes: Mujer Importante
Santiago Jiménez Jr.: Santiago Strikes Again
Mongo Santamaría and his Latin Jazz Orchestra: Free Spirit – Espiritu Libre
María Conchita Alonso: María Conchita
Johnny Lozada: Invítame
Menudo: Evolución
Sheena Easton: Todo Me Recuerda a Ti
Raphael: Eternamente Tuyo
Eddie Palmieri: Palo Pa' Rumba
Poncho Sánchez: Bien Sabroso!
Rubén Blades: Buscando América
Willie Colón: Criollo
Daniela Romo: Amor Prohibido
Franco De Vita: Franco De Vita
Guadalupe Pineda: Te Amo
Danny Rivera: Así Cantaba Cheito González, Vol. 2
Danny Rivera: En la Intimidad
Danny Rivera: Así Cantaba Cheito González, Vol. 2
Leonardo Paniagua: El Gusto del Pueblo
Cheo Feliciano: 25 Años de Sentimientos
Fausto Rey: Mi Linda Música Merengue!
Los Caminantes: Porque Tengo Tu Amor
Los Iracundos: Tú Con Él
Dyango: 
Ramón Ayala y Los Bravos del Norte: Vidrios Rotos
Ramón Ayala y Los Bravos del Norte: El Corrido del Tuerto
Ramón Ayala y Los Bravos del Norte: Vestida de Color de Rosa
Little Joe: Renunciación
Julio Iglesias: 1100 Bel Air Place
José María Napoleón: Contra Viento y Marea
Soda Stereo: Soda Stereo
Wilkins: La Historia Se Repite
Guillermo Dávila: 
Los Invasores de Nuevo León: Ya Pa Qué
Vicente Fernández: Un Mexicano en la México
Carmita Jiménez: En Vivo
Carmita Jiménez: Interpreta a Los Panchos
Massiel: Sola en Libertad
La Mafia: Hot Stuff
Luis Miguel: Ya nunca más
Luis Miguel: Palabra de honor
Los Yonic's: Pero No Me Dejes
Rudy Pérez: Ruby
Gualberto Ibarreto: Gualberto Ibarreto
Gualberto Ibarreto: No Juegues con Mi Amor
Los Humildes: Anoche Soñé
Israel Kantor: Con La Verdad
Andy Montañez: Versatil
Lani Hall: Lani Hall
Bobby Valentín and Cano Estremera: En Acción
Amanda Miguel: El Último Sonido, Vol. III
Roberto Blades and Orquesta Inmensidad: Alegría
Elio Roca: Bienvenido Sea el Amor
Lupita D'Alessio: Yo
Charytín: Se Acabó
Charytín: Guitarras y Violines
Los Tigres del Norte:  Internacionalmente Norteños
Dulce: Tu Muñeca
Manoella Torres: Acéptame Como Soy
Fania All-Stars: Lo Que Pide la Gente
Willie Rosario: Nuevos Horizents
Glenn Monroig: No Finjas
Cuco Valoy: Cuco Valoy y Su Tribu
Fernando Villalona: Ayer Y Hoy
Mazz: It's Bad!
Willie Colón: Tiempo Pa Matar
El Combo de Ayer: 20 Años Después
Oscar D'León: Con Cariño
Roberto Carlos: 
Miguel Bosé: Bandido
Mecano: Ya Viene el Sol

Deaths
Pellin Rodriguez

Births

1985

Events
February 26The 27th Annual Grammy Awards are held at The Shrine Auditorium in Los Angeles, California.:
Plácido Domingo wins the Grammy Award for Best Latin Pop Performance for Siempre en Mi Corazón — Always in My Heart.
Sheena Easton and Luis Miguel wins the Grammy Award for Best Mexican/Mexican-American Performance for "Me Gustas Tal Como Eres".
Eddie Palmieri wins the Grammy Award for Best Tropical Latin Performance for Palo Pa Rumbia.
June 29Billboard debuts three new Latin music albums charts which are divided by genres as opposed to selected locations in the United States. The three Latin music charts established are Latin Pop Albums, Regional Mexican Albums, and Tropical Albums.

Notable singles

Raphael: "Yo Sigo Siendo Aquel" (US Cashbox: "Most Added")
Jorge Rigo: "Sola" (US Cashbox: "Most Added")
Lani Hall and Roberto Carlos: "De Repente el Amor" (US Cashbox: "Most Added")
Carlos Mata: "¿Que Porque Te Quiero?" (US Cashbox: "Most Added")
Hermanos (Various artists): "Cantaré, cantarás"  (US Cashbox: "Most Added")
Juan Gabriel: "Querida" (#1 in Mexico)
Luis Miguel: "Palabra de Honor" (#1 in Mexico)
Lucía Méndez: "Corazón de piedra" (#1 in Mexico)
Rocío Dúrcal and Juan Gabriel: "Déjame vivir" (#1 in Mexico)
Chiquetete: "Esta cobardía" (#1 in Mexico)
Miguel Bosé: "Amante bandido" (#1 in Spain)
Alaska y Dinarama: "Ni Tú, Ni Nadie"" (#1 in Spain)
Iván: "Baila" (#1 in Spain)

Album releases

[pt] Nordeste Já, a collective release featuring dozens of popular Brazilian performers with the intent of aiding the Brazilian northeast after severe droughts in the region. The release featured two songs: "Chega de Magoa" and "Seca D'Água"; both songs are credited as being written by "collective creation".
Álvaro Torres: Tres
José José: Promesas
Danny Rivera, Vicente Carattini y Los Cantores de San Juan and Alpha IV: Controversia
Pimpinela: Lucía y Joaquín
José Luis Rodríguez: El Último Beso
Dyango: 
Guillermo Dávila: Cantaré Para Ti
Camilo Sesto: Tuyo
Yolandita Monge: Luz de Luna
Charytín: Verdades Desnudas
Miguel Gallardo: 
Marisela: 
Miami Sound Machine: Primitive Love
Julio Iglesias: Libra
Ángela Carrasco: Dama del Caribe
José Feliciano: 
Carlos Mata: 
Raphael: Yo Sigo Siendo Aquel
Ramón Ayala y Los Bravos Del Norte: La que se fue tierra mala
Fito Olivares: El Cometa
Vicente Fernández: De un Rancho a Otro
Los Barón de Apodaca: Hoy no hago mas que recordarte
La Sonora Dinamita: La Cumbia del sida
Los Tigres del Norte: El Otro México
La Sombra: Sombra Love
La Sombra: The Windy City Boys
Legião Urbana: Legião Urbana
Ramón Ayala y Los Bravos Del Norte: En Gira Internacional
Ramón Ayala y Los Bravos Del Norte: Laguna Seca Ranch
Ramón Ayala y Los Bravos Del Norte: Un rinconcito en el cielo
Los Baby's: Piensa en Mi
Los Yonic's: Con Mariachi
Los Yonic's: Los Yonic's
Los Invasores de Nuevo León: Me rompieron tu retrato
La Mafia: Herencia Norteña
La Mafia: Neon Static
Los Caminantes: Cada Día Mejor
Grupo Pegasso: Como una Estrella
Los Bukis: A Donde Vas
Jochy Hernández: Ahora Yo
Cheo Feliciano: Regresa al Amor
Juan Luis Guera & 4.40: Mudanza y Acarreo
Willie Chirino: Zarabanda
Tommy Olivencia & su Orquesta: Ayer, Hoy, Mañana y Siempre
Tony Croatto: Mi luncha
Wilfrido Vargas: La Medicina
Tavín Pumarejo and Conjunto Quisqueya: La Combinación Ganadora
Johnny Ventura: Navidad Sin Ti
El Gran Combo de Puerto Rico: Innovations
El Gran Combo de Puerto Rico: Y Su Pueblo
Milly y los Vecinos: Dinastia
Rubén Blades: Escenas
Bonny Cepeda: Noche de Discoteca
Cuco Valoy: Mejor Que Nunca
Frankie Ruiz: Solista pero no solo
Johnny Ventura: El Hombre y Su Musica
Fernando Villalona: ¡A la Carga!
Orquesta La Solucion: Una Canita Más
Bobby Valentín:  Algo Excepcional
Jossie Esteban y la Patrulla 15: Nuestro 5to Aniversario: El Muchachito
Alex Bueno: Alex Bueno & Orquesta Liberacion
Héctor Lavoe: Reventó
Andy Montañez: Andy Montañez
Willie Rosario: Afincando
Isabel Pantoja: 
Roberto Carlos: 
Lani Hall: Es Fácil Amar
Los Humildes: 13 Aniversario/13 Album/13 Exitos
Eddie Palmieri: Solito
Celia Cruz and Johnny Pacheco: De Nuevo
Yolanda del Río: Un Amor Especial
Grupo Niche: 
Louie Ramirez & Su Orquesta and Ray de la Paz: Alegres y Románticos
Marvin Santiago: El Sonero del Pueblo
Lucecita Benítez: Éxitos Callejeros
Carlos Mata: Marisela
Mazz: The Bad Boys
Luis Miguel and Lucerito: Fiebre de amor
Ultraje a Rigor: Nós Vamos Invadir sua Praia
Legião Urbana: Legião Urbana
RPM: Revoluções por Minuto

Deaths

Births
January 7J Balvin, Colombian reggaeton singer
December 23Arcángel, American reggaeton singer

1986

1987

1988

1989

References
General
Print editions of the Notitas Musicales magazine for the #1 songs in Mexico.
 (#1 songs in Spain)

Further reading

 
1980s in music